Xanadu (1981) is Menudo's eighth Spanish album and the second one released in 1981 featuring René Farrait, Johnny Lozada, Ricky Meléndez, Xavier Serbiá and Miguel Cancel. Half of the songs on the album were previously featured on past albums and re-recorded with this new line up; the other half of the songs are from other English-speaking groups that were big hits in the late 1970s and early 1980s, translated into Spanish.

Track listing
A Bailar [2:49] - Singer: René Farrait
Cosita Loca Llamada Amor [2:38] - Singer: René Farrait
Ella-a-a [5:01] - Singer: All the group
Fui Hecho Para Amarte [4:02] - Singer: Johnny Lozada
No Que No [2:58] - Singer: Xavier Serbia 
No Se Puede Parar La Música [3:03] - Singer: René Farrait
Sueños [2:48] - Singer: René Farrait
Voulez Vous [3:48] - Singer: All the group
Voy A América [2:57] - Singer: René Farrait
Xanadu [3:18] - Singer: Miguel Cancel

Cosita Loca Llamada Amor = "Crazy Little Thing Called Love" (Queen)
Fui Hecho Para Amarte = "I Was Made For Lovin' You" (Kiss)
No Se Puede Parar La Música = "Can't Stop The Music" (Village People)
"Voulez-Vous", sung originally by ABBA.
"Xanadu", sung originally by Olivia Newton-John, performed by the Electric Light Orchestra.

 

Menudo (band) albums
1981 albums